Nicola Agnozzi (5 November 1911 – 17 February 2008) was an Italian Prelate of Roman Catholic Church.

Agnozzi was born in Fermo, Italy and was ordained a priest on 18 March 1934 from the religious Order of Friars Minor Conventual. He was appointed Auxiliary bishop of the Diocese of Ndola in Zambia, along with Titular Bishop of Adramyttium on 2 April 1962 and was appointed bishop on 1 July 1962.

Agnozzi was appointed to bishop of Diocese of Ndola in Zambia on 1 February 1966 and resigned on 10 July 1975. On 24 March 1976 he was appointed to the Diocese of Ariano, as well as the Diocese of Lacedonia. Agnozzi became bishop of the Diocese of Ariano Irpino-Lacedonia when the Ariano and Lacedonia dioceses were consolidated in 1986, retiring from diocese on 11 June 1988.

See also
Diocese of Ndola (Zambia)
Diocese of Ariano
Diocese of Lacedonia

External links

Catholic-Hierarchy
Ariano Irpino-Lacedonia Diocese

20th-century Italian Roman Catholic bishops
20th-century Roman Catholic bishops in Zambia
Participants in the Second Vatican Council
1911 births
2008 deaths
Roman Catholic bishops of Ndola